Karina Ivette Sosa de Rodas (born 5 April 1976) is a Salvadoran politician and member of the Farabundo Martí National Liberation Front (FMLN). She is a member of the national Legislative Assembly of El Salvador starting in 2012, being re-elected to the post twice after (in 2015 and 2018). 

In May 2018, Sosa ran unopposed for the FMLN's vice-presidential nomination in the forthcoming 2019 presidential election. She won her party's nomination with 21,197 votes, thereby becoming the running mate of FMLN presidential candidate, Hugo Martínez.

References

Living people
1976 births
Members of the Legislative Assembly of El Salvador
21st-century Salvadoran women politicians
21st-century Salvadoran politicians
Farabundo Martí National Liberation Front politicians